The 1977 Vuelta a España was the 32nd edition of the Vuelta a España, one of cycling's Grand Tours. The Vuelta began in Dehesa de Campoamor, with a prologue individual time trial on 26 April, and Stage 10 occurred on 6 May with a stage to Barcelona. The race finished in Miranda de Ebro on 15 May.

Prologue
26 April 1977 — Dehesa de Campoamor to Dehesa de Campoamor,  (ITT)

Stage 1
27 April 1977 — Dehesa de Campoamor to La Manga,

Stage 2
28 April 1977 — La Manga to Murcia,

Stage 3
29 April 1977 — Murcia to Benidorm,

Stage 4
30 April 1977 — Benidorm to Benidorm,  (ITT)

Stage 5
1 May 1977 — Benidorm to El Saler,

Stage 6
2 May 1977 — Valencia to Teruel,

Stage 7
3 May 1977 — Teruel to Alcalà de Xivert,

Stage 8
4 May 1977 — Alcalà de Xivert to Tortosa,

Stage 9
5 May 1977 — Tortosa to Salou,

Stage 10
6 May 1977 — Salou to Barcelona,

References

1977 Vuelta a España
Vuelta a España stages